This is a list of victories by the cycling team , former known as Team Deutsche Telekom, T-Mobile Team, Team High Road, Team Columbia, Team Columbia-HTC, Team HTC-Columbia.

Sources

1989 – Team Stuttgart

 Stage 2 Herald Sun Tour, Udo Bölts
  National Road race, Dariusz Kajzer

1990 – Team Stuttgart

 Polder-Kempen, Ad Wijnands
 Driedaagse van De Panne-Koksijde, Erwin Nijboer
 Vuelta a España
Stage 4, Erwin Nijboer
Stage 14, Bernd Gröne
  National Road race, Udo Bölts
 Stage 4 Tour of Ireland, Markus Schleicher
 Overall Herald Sun Tour, Udo Bölts
Stage 8a, Hartmut Bölts

1991 – Team Telekom

 Overall Étoile de Bessèges, Ad Wijnands
 Itzulia Basque Country
 Points classification, Ad Wijnands
Stage 1, Ad Wijnands
 Prologue Tour of Sweden, Dean Woods
 Stage 7 Tour of Sweden, Carsten Wolf
 Circuit Escaut-Durme, Markus Schleicher
 Stage 4 Ronde van Nederland, Gerard Veldscholten
 Stage 2 Australian Alpine Classic, Hartmut Bölts

1992 – Team Telekom

 Stage 3 Itzulia Basque Country, Udo Bölts
 Overall Trophée des Grimpeurs, Marc Madiot
 GP Kanton Aargau, Uwe Ampler
 Stage 5 4 Jours de Dunkerque, Marc Madiot
 Stage 19 Giro d'Italia, Udo Bölts
 Omloop Schelde-Durme, Markus Schleicher
 Schaal Sels, Wilfried Peeters

1993 – Team Telekom

 Stage 6 La Méditerranéenne, Olaf Ludwig
 Stage 1 Tirreno–Adriatico, Erik Zabel
 Stage 6 Tirreno–Adriatico, Uwe Raab
 Stage 5 Setmana Catalana de Ciclisme, Steffen Wesemann
 Stage 2 Vuelta a Aragón, Olaf Ludwig
 Tour de Berne, Erik Zabel
 Stage 5 Four Days of Dunkirk, Olaf Ludwig
 Stage 4 Tour de Romandie, Rolf Aldag
 Stage 4 Dekra Open Stuttgart, Olaf Ludwig
 Stage 13 Tour de France, Olaf Ludwig
 Versatel Classic, Olaf Ludwig
  Points classification Vuelta a Burgos, Erik Zabel
 Stage 11 Tour de l'Avenir, Steffen Wesemann
  National Road race, Bernd Gröne

1994 – Team Telekom

  National Road race, Jens Heppner
 Stage 10 Ruta Mexico, Jürgen Werner
 Classic Haribo, Erik Zabel
  Points classification Vuelta a Aragón, Erik Zabel
Stages 2, 3 & 5, Erik Zabel
Stage 7, Olaf Ludwig
 Eschborn–Frankfurt, Olaf Ludwig
 Stage 4 Four Days of Dunkirk, Olaf Ludwig
 Rund um Köln, Udo Bölts
 Overall Dekra Open Stutgart, Rolf Aldag
Stage 2, Rolf Aldag 
 Omloop van de Westkust, Udo Bölts
 Stage 5 Tour of Britain, Olaf Ludwig
 Stage 4 Regio-Tour, Michael Rich
 Overall Tour du Limousin, Jens Heppner
Stage 1, Jens Heppner
 Stages 2, 5, 7 & 8 Tour de l'Avenir, Erik Zabel
 LuK Challenge Chrono, Jens Lehmann
 Paris–Tours, Erik Zabel
 Overall Herald Sun Tour, Christian Henn
Stage 7, Christian Henn 
Stages 8 & 9, Udo Bölts

1995 – Team Telekom

 Stage 1 Tirreno–Adriatico, Erik Zabel
 Stage 2 Vuelta a Aragón, Erik Zabel
 Veenendaal–Veenendaal Classic, Olaf Ludwig
 Stages 1 & 7 Four Days of Dunkirk, Erik Zabel
 Stages 3 & 4 Tour de Suisse, Erik Zabel
  National Road race, Udo Bölts
 Stages 6 & 17, Tour de France, Erik Zabel
 Stage 2 Tour du Limousin, Jens Heppner
 Stage 3 Tour du Limousin, Rolf Aldag
 Stage 12 Vuelta a España, Bert Dietz
 Stage 13 Vuelta a España, Christian Henn

1996 – Team Telekom

  Points classification Vuelta a Andalucía, Erik Zabel
Stage 2, Olaf Ludwig
Stage 4, Erik Zabel
 Stages 1, 2 & 4 Setmana Catalana de Ciclisme, Erik Zabel
 Stage 1 Driedaagse De Panne, Olaf Ludwig
 GP Herning, Bjarne Riis
 Hannover–Berlin, Erik Zabel
 Stage 1 4 Jours de Dunkerque, Olaf Ludwig
 Stage 2 4 Jours de Dunkerque, Erik Zabel
 Overall Course de la Paix, Steffen Wesemann
Stages 1, 2, 4, 6, 9, 10 & 11, Steffen Wesemann
Stage 3, Michael Andersson
 Rund um die Hainleite, Mario Kummer
 Rund um Köln, Erik Zabel
 Stage 2 Tour of Luxembourg, Erik Zabel 
 Stage 2 Tour of Sweden, Christian Henn
 Stage 3 Tour of Sweden, Michael Andersson
 Stage 4 Tour of Sweden, Bert Dietz
 Stage 7 Tour of Sweden, Mikael Holst Kyneb
 Stage 7 Tour de Suisse, Udo Bölts
  National Road race, Bjarne Riis 
  National Road race, Christian Henn
  Overall Tour de France, Bjarne Riis
 Points classification, Erik Zabel
 Youth classification, Jan Ullrich
Stages 3 & 10, Erik Zabel
Stages 9 & 16, Bjarne Riis
Stage 20, Jan Ullrich
 Overall Rheinland-Pfalz Rundfahrt, Olaf Ludwig
Stage 3, Steffen Wesemann
Stages 4 & 10, Olaf Ludwig
 Versatel Classic, Erik Zabel
 Stage 5 Vuelta a Castilla y León, Udo Bölts
 Clásica de San Sebastián, Udo Bölts
 Overall Regio-Tour, Jan Ullrich
Stage 1, Jens Heppner
Stage 3, Jan Ullrich
 Stage 3 Tour du Limousin, Rolf Aldag
 Stage 5 Ronde van Nederland, Erik Zabel
 Stage 6 Ronde van Nederland, Olaf Ludwig
 Coppa Sabatini, Bjarne Riis 
 Overall Tour of China, Michael Andersson
Stage 3, Michael Andersson

1997 – Team Telekom

  National Road race, Jan Ullrich
  National Road race, Michel Lafis
 Trofeo Palma, Erik Zabel
  Overall Vuelta a Andalucía, Erik Zabel
 Points classification, Erik Zabel
Stage 1, Erik Zabel
 Trofeo Luis Puig, Erik Zabel
  Points classification Volta a la Comunitat Valenciana, Erik Zabel
 Stage 3, Erik Zabel
 Stage 4 Tirreno–Adriatico, Giovanni Lombardi
 Milan–San Remo, Erik Zabel
 Rund um den Kreis Unna, Erik Zabel 
  Points classification Vuelta a Aragón, Erik Zabel
 Mountains classification, Jan Ullrich
Stage 1, Bert Dietz
 Scheldeprijs, Erik Zabel
 Amstel Gold Race, Bjarne Riis
 Continentale Classic, Erik Zabel
 GP Kanton Aargau, Udo Bölts
 Colmar–Strasbourg, Udo Bölts
 GP Aarhus, Bjarne Riis 
  Overall Course de la Paix, Steffen Wesemann
 Points classification, Steffen Wesemann
 Mountains classification, Christian Henn
Stages 2, 3 & 7, Steffen Wesemann
Stage 6, Christian Henn
 GP Herning, Bjarne Riis 
 Stage 1 Euskal Bizikleta, Giovanni Lombardi
 Stage 6 Euskal Bizikleta, Udo Bölts
 Overall Bayern Rundfahrt, Christian Henn
Stages 2 & 5, Erik Zabel
Stage 3, Christian Henn
 Stage 1 Tour of Luxembourg, Erik Zabel
 Overall Critérium du Dauphiné, Udo Bölts
 Mountain classification, Udo Bölts
Stage 5, Jens Heppner
 Stage 2 Tour de Suisse, Erik Zabel
 Stage 4 Tour de Suisse, Jan Ullrich
 Stage 8 Tour de Suisse, Rolf Aldag
 Flèche Ardennaise, Christian Henn
 Ostbelgien Rundfahrt, Christian Henn
  Overall Tour de France, Jan Ullrich
 Points classification, Erik Zabel
 Youth classification, Jan Ullrich
Stages 3, 7 & 8, Erik Zabel
Stages 10 & 12, Jan Ullrich
 Stage 4 Vuelta a Castilla y León, Georg Totschnig
  Points classification Danmark Rundt, Giovanni Lombardi
Stages 2 & 6, Giovanni Lombardi
 Stage 3 Danmark Rundt, Christian Henn
 Cyclassics Hamburg, Jan Ullrich
 Stage 5 Regio-Tour, Kai Hundertmarck
 Stage 5 Ronde van Nederland, Erik Zabel
 Stage 6 Ronde van Nederland, Giovanni Lombardi
 Rund um Berlin, Erik Zabel
 Overall Hessen Rundfahrt, Christian Henn
Stages 2 & 5, Kai Hundertmarck
 Stage 3 GP Wilhelm Tell, Rolf Aldag
 Stage 4 GP Wilhelm Tell, Bjarne Riis

1998 – Team Telekom

 Trofeo Palma, Erik Zabel
 Stage 1 Volta a la Comunitat Valenciana, Erik Zabel
 Tirreno–Adriatico
Points classification, Erik Zabel
Stages 2, 7 & 8, Erik Zabel
Stage 6, Giovanni Lombardi
 Milan–San Remo, Erik Zabel
 Prologue Tour de Normandie, Andreas Klöden
 Overall Niedersachsen Rundfahrt, Andreas Klöden 
Stage 3, Andreas Klöden
 Stage 7 Course de la Paix, Bert Dietz
 GP de Wallonie, Udo Bölts
 Delta Profonde, Erik Zabel
 GP Herning, Bjarne Riis
 Bayern Rundfahrt
Prologue and Stage 2, Dirk Müller
Stages 1 & 4, Erik Zabel
 Sparkassen Giro Bochum, Jan Ullrich
 Stage 6 Euskal Bizikleta, Bjarne Riis
 Stage 4 Vuelta a Castilla y León, Steffen Wesemann
 Stage 4 Tour of Luxembourg, Erik Zabel
 Stage 5 Route d'Occitanie, Erik Zabel
  National Road race, Erik Zabel
 Tour de France
 Points classification, Erik Zabel
 Youth classification, Jan Ullrich
Stage 3, Jens Heppner
Stages 7, 16 & 20, Jan Ullrich
 Prologue Sachsen Tour, Steffen Wesemann
 Stage 7 Sachsen Tour, Dirk Müller
 Rund um Berlin, Jan Ullrich
 Rund um die Nürnberger Altstadt, Jan Ullrich
 Stage 7 Vuelta a España, Giovanni Lombardi

1999 – Team Telekom

 Stages 2 & 4, Tour Down Under, Erik Zabel
  Points classification Volta a la Comunitat Valenciana, Erik Zabel
Stage 2, Erik Zabel
 Stage 3 Volta ao Algarve, Andreas Klöden
 Stage 1 Vuelta a Aragón, Erik Zabel
 Stage 3 Ster ZLM Toer, Ralf Grabsch
 Eschborn–Frankfurt, Erik Zabel
  Overall Course de la Paix, Steffen Wesemann
Stages 1, 4 & 5, Danilo Hondo
Stages 2, 7 & 10, Steffen Wesemann
 Rund um Köln, Jens Heppner
  Overall Deutschland Tour, Jens Heppner
 Points classification, Erik Zabel
 Mountain classification, Jens Heppner
Stage 2, Rolf Aldag
Stage 6, Erik Zabel
 Overall Bayern Rundfahrt, Rolf Aldag
Stages 2 & 5, Erik Zabel
 Stage 4 Euskal Bizikleta, Giovanni Lombardi
 Sparkassen Giro, Erik Zabel
 Stage 3 Tour of Austria, Giovanni Lombardi
 Stages 4 & 5, Volta a Catalunya, Erik Zabel
  National Road race, Udo Bölts
 Tour de France
 Points classification, Erik Zabel
Stage 10, Giuseppe Guerini
 Vuelta a Castilla y León
 Points classification, Alberto Elli
 Mountain classification, Alberto Elli
 Stage 1 Regio-Tour, Danilo Hondo
 Stage 5 Regio-Tour, Giovanni Lombardi
  Overall Vuelta a España, Jan Ullrich
Stages 6 & 20, Jan Ullrich

2000 – Team Telekom

 Stage 4 Tour Down Under, Steffen Wesemann
 Stage 5 Tour Down Under, Erik Zabel
 Stage 1 Rapport Tour, Alberto Elli
 Stage 1 Vuelta a Andalucía, Erik Zabel
 Trofeo Luis Puig, Erik Zabel 
  Points classification Vuelta Ciclista a Murcia, Alberto Elli
 Stage 4 Comunitat Valenciana, Erik Zabel 
 Stage 4 Tirreno–Adriatico, Erik Zabel
 Overall Paris–Nice, Andreas Klöden
Stage 7, Andreas Klöden
 Milan–San Remo, Erik Zabel
  Points classification Setmana Catalana de Ciclisme, Erik Zabel
Stages 3 & 4, Erik Zabel 
 Overall Itzulia Basque Country, Andreas Klöden 
Stage 6, Andreas Klöden
 Stage 6 Vuelta a Aragón, Giovanni Lombardi 
 Amstel Gold Race, Erik Zabel
 Rund um Köln, Steffen Wesemann
 GP Kanton Aargau, Steffen Wesemann
 Eschborn–Frankfurt, Kai Hundertmarck
 Course de la Paix
Stages 1 & 4, Steffen Wesemann 
Stages 3 & 5, Danilo Hondo
Stage 7, Andreas Klöden
 Stage 3 Bayern Rundfahrt, Erik Zabel
 Stage 1 Euskal Bizikleta, Giovanni Lombardi
  Points classification Deutschland Tour, Erik Zabel
Stage 1, Jens Heppner
Stages 2, 5 & 8, Erik Zabel 
Stage 3, Udo Bölts
 GP de Wallonie, Alberto Elli
 Overall Österreich-Rundfahrt, Georg Totschnig
Stages 1 & 8, Giovanni Lombardi
Stage 5, Georg Totschnig
 Overall`Tour de Luxembourg, Alberto Elli
 Stage 1 TTT, Tour de Suisse
 Stage 2 Tour of Sweden, Danilo Hondo
 Volta Catalunya
Stages 2 & 3, Erik Zabel 
Stages 5 & 6, Giovanni Lombardi
  National Road race, Rolf Aldag
 Tour de France
 Points classification, Erik Zabel
 Stage 20, Erik Zabel
 Stage 4 Vuelta a Burgos, Giovanni Lombardi
 Coppa Ugo Agostoni, Jan Ullrich
 Stage 18 Vuelta a España, Alexandre Vinokourov
 Stage 3 Rheinland-Pfalz Rundfahrt, Erik Zabel

2001 – Team Telekom

 Stage 5 Tour Down Under, Kai Hundertmarck
 Trofeo Palma, Erik Zabel
 Trofeo Cala Millor, Erik Zabel
 Stage 3 Vuelta a Andalucía, Erik Zabel
 Trofeo Luis Puig, Erik Zabel
 Stage 2 Comunitat Valenciana, Erik Zabel
  Points classification Paris–Nice, Erik Zabel
 Milano–San Remo, Erik Zabel
 Stage 1 Driedaagse De Panne, Danilo Hondo
 Rund um Köln, Gian Matteo Fagnini
 Berner Rundfahrt, Danilo Hondo
 Eschborn–Frankfurt (U23), David Kopp
 Stages 2 & 3 Giro d'Italia, Danilo Hondo 
 Stages 3, 4, 5 & 6 Bayern Rundfahrt, Erik Zabel
 Overall Deutschland Tour, Alexandre Vinokourov
Stages 2, 3 & 8, Erik Zabel
Stage 6, Alexandre Vinokourov
Stage 7, Rolf Aldag 
 Tour de Suisse
 Points classification, Erik Zabel
Stages 1 & 8, Erik Zabel
Stage 3, Alexandre Vinokourov
  National Road race, Jan Ullrich
 Tour de France
 Points classification, Erik Zabel
Stages 1, 3 & 19, Erik Zabel
 Versatel Classic, Jan Ullrich
 Stage 1 Danmark Rundt, Danilo Hondo
 Cyclassics Hamburg, Erik Zabel
 Stage 5 Ronde van Nederland, Danilo Hondo
 Stage 1 Hessen Rundfahrt, Jan Ullrich
 Stages 2, 3 & 4 Vuelta a España, Erik Zabel
 Giro dell'Emilia, Jan Ullrich
 Stage 3 Giro Provincia Lucca, Jan Ullrich

2002 – Team Telekom

 Overall Paris–Nice, Alexandre Vinokourov
Stage 4, Alexandre Vinokourov
 Stage 1 Tirreno–Adriatico, Erik Zabel
 Setmana Catalana de Ciclisme
Stages 1 & 2, Erik Zabel
Stage 4, Giuseppe Guerini
 Stage 2 Vuelta a Aragón, Erik Zabel
 Stage 6 Niedersachsen Rundfahrt, Robert Bartko
 Eschborn–Frankfurt, Erik Zabel
 Bayern Rundfahrt
Stage 1, Rolf Aldag
Stage 6, Erik Zabel
 Stage 1 Tour de Luxembourg, Erik Zabel
 Stages 1, 2, 5 & 7 Deutschland Tour, Erik Zabel
 Stage 2 Volta a Catalunya, Danilo Hondo
 Tour de Suisse
 Points classification, Erik Zabel
Stages 2 & 8, Erik Zabel
Stage 3, Alexandre Vinokourov
  National Road race, Danilo Hondo
 Stage 6 Tour de France, Erik Zabel
 Versatel Classic, Erik Zabel
 Stage 1 Ronde van Nederland, Erik Zabel
 Grote Prijs Jef Scherens, Andreas Klier
 Nürnberger Altstadt, Erik Zabel
 Hessen Rundfahrt
 Stage 3, Danilo Hondo
 Stage 6, Stephan Schreck
 Stage 2 Rheinland-Pfalz Rundfahrt, Danilo Hondo
 Vuelta a España
 Points classification, Erik Zabel

2003 – Team Telekom

 Stage 3 Vuelta a Murcia, Erik Zabel
 Overall Paris–Nice, Alexandre Vinokourov
Stage 5, Alexandre Vinokourov
 Stages 1 & 5 Setmana Catalana de Ciclisme, Erik Zabel
 GP Miguel Induráin, Matthias Kessler
 Gent–Wevelgem, Andreas Klier
 Amstel Gold Race, Alexandre Vinokourov
 Rund Flughafen Köln/Bonn, Steffen Wesemann
 Overall Course de la Paix, Steffen Wesemann
Stages 1 & 2, Danilo Hondo
Stage 3, Steffen Wesemann
 Stage 4 Bayern Rundfahrt, Erik Zabel
 Stage 1 Deutschland Tour, Erik Zabel
 Overall Tour de Suisse, Alexandre Vinokourov
Stage 1, Alexandre Vinokourov
Stage 7, Sergei Yakovlev
  National Road race, Erik Zabel
 Stage 9 Tour de France
 Stage 6 Sachsen Tour, Steffen Wesemann
 Versatel Classic, Erik Zabel
 Sparkassen Giro, Rolf Aldag
 Championship of Zurich, Daniele Nardello
 Stage 3 Ronde van Nederland, Erik Zabel
 GP Triberg-Schwarzwald, Torsten Hiekmann
 Nürnberger Altstadt, Kai Hundertmarck
 Hessen Rundfahrt
Stage 3, Kai Hundertmarck
Stage 5, Daniele Nardello
 Stages 10 & 11 Vuelta a España, Erik Zabel
 Overall Rheinland-Pfalz Rundfahrt, Daniele Nardello
Stage 2, Daniele Nardello
 LUK Cup Bühl, Matthias Kessler
 Paris–Tours, Erik Zabel

2004 – T-Mobile Team

 Vuelta Independencia, Maxim Iglinskiy
 Stage 5 Vuelta a Andalucía, Erik Zabel
 Stages 5, 7 & 8 Paris–Nice, Alexandre Vinokourov
 GP Miguel Induráin, Matthias Kessler 
 Ronde van Vlaanderen, Steffen Wesemann
 Rund um Köln, Erik Zabel
 Prologue Tour of Hellas, Maxim Iglinskiy
 Stage 1 GP Sunny Beach, Maxim Iglinskiy
 Stages 7 & 9 Course de la Paix, Erik Zabel
 Stages 2 & 5 Bayern Rundfahrt, Erik Zabel
 Overall Österreich-Rundfahrt, Cadel Evans
Stage 2, Cadel Evans
 Overall Tour de Suisse, Jan Ullrich
Stages 1 & 9, Jan Ullrich
 Stage 1 Mainfranken-Tour, Heinrich Haussler
  National Road race, Andreas Klöden
 Stage 1 Sachsen Tour, Stephan Schreck
 Overall Regio-Tour, Alexandre Vinokourov
Stage 1, Stephan Schreck
Stages 2 & 3, Alexandre Vinokourov
 Stage 3 Rheinland-Pfalz Rundfahrt, Rolf Aldag
 Coppa Sabatini, Jan Ullrich

2005 – T-Mobile Team

 Liège–Bastogne–Liège, Alexandre Vinokourov
 Eschborn–Frankfurt, Erik Zabel
 Stage 5 Bayern Rundfahrt, Andreas Klöden
 Tour de Luxembourg
Stage 1, Eric Baumann
Stage 5, Bram Schmitz
 Stage 4 Critérium du Dauphiné, Alexandre Vinokourov
 Stage 2 Tour de Suisse, Jan Ullrich
  National U23 Time trial, Paul Martens
  National Road race, Alexandre Vinokourov
  National Road race, Sergei Ivanov
 Tour de France
Stages 11 & 21, Alexandre Vinokourov
Stage 19, Giuseppe Guerini
 Stage 8 Deutschland Tour, Jan Ullrich
 Stage 4 Tour of Britain, Sergei Ivanov
 Omloop Leiedal, Alexandre Vinokourov
 Paris–Tours, Erik Zabel

2006 – T-Mobile Team

 Stages 6 & 7 Tour of California, Olaf Pollack
 Stages 1 & 4 Rheinland-Pfalz Rundfahrt, André Greipel
 Stage 5 Int.Thürin-Rundf, Mark Cavendish
 Stage 11 Giro d'Italia, Jan Ullrich
 Prologue Tour de Luxembourg, Kim Kirchen
 Stages 4 & 5 Tour de Berlin, Mark Cavendish
 Overall Vuelta a Asturias, Óscar Sevilla
Stage 2, Óscar Sevilla
 Overall Tour de Suisse, Jan Ullrich
Stage 9 Jan Ullrich
  National Road race, Bernhard Kohl
  National Road race, Kim Kirchen
 Stage 3 Solidarnosc Champions, Mark Cavendish
 Tour de France
Stage 3, Matthias Kessler
Stages 7 & 19, Serhiy Honchar
 Stage 4 Danmark Rundt, Olaf Pollack
 Overall Rothaus Regio Tour, Andreas Klöden
Stage 3, Michael Rogers
Stage 4, Andreas Klöden
 Stage 1 Hessen Rundfahrt, Patrik Sinkewitz

2007 – T-Mobile Team/Team High Road

 Stage 2 Volta ao Algarve, Bernhard Eisel
 Stage 2 3 Jours de Normandie, Andrey Klyuev
 Milano–Busseto, Ian Stannard
 Stage 4 Tour de Normandie, Andrey Klyuev
 Gent–Wevelgem, Marcus Burghardt
 Scheldeprijs, Mark Cavendish
 Rund um Düren, Marcel Beima
 Stage 3 Niedersachsen Rundfahrt, Gerald Ciolek
 Eschborn–Frankfurt, Patrik Sinkewitz
 Stages 3 & 6 4 Jours de Dunkerque, Mark Cavendish
 Rheinland-Pfalz Rundfahrt, Gerald Ciolek
 Stages 2 & 6 Volta Catalunya, Mark Cavendish
 Lancaster Classic, Bernhard Eisel
 Reading Classic, Bernhard Eisel
 Stage 4 Ster ZLM Toer, Mark Cavendish
  National Time trial, Bert Grabsch
  National Time trial, Marco Pinotti
 Stages 2 & 8 Österreich-Rundfahrt, Gerald Ciolek
 Tour de France
Stage 7, Linus Gerdemann
Stage 15, Kim Kirchen
 Sachsen Tour
Stages 1 & 2, André Greipel
Stage 3, Eric Baumann
Stage 5, Stephan Schreck
 Stage 6 Danmark Rundt, Mark Cavendish
 Stages 6, 7 & 9 Deutschland Tour, Gerald Ciolek
 Stage 2 BinckBank Tour, Mark Cavendish
 Vuelta a España
Stage 8, Bert Grabsch
Stage 13, Andreas Klier
 Prologue and Stage 1 Tour of Britain, Mark Cavendish
 Hessen Rundfahrt
Stage 1, Gerald Ciolek
Stages 3 & 5, Marcus Burghardt
 Stage 3 Tour l'Eurométropole, Mark Cavendish

2008 – Team High Road/Team Columbia

  National Time trial, Adam Hansen
 Schwalbe Classic, André Greipel
 Overall Tour Down Under, André Greipel
Stages 2, 4, 5 & 6, André Greipel
 Stage 7 Tour of California, George Hincapie
 Stage 5 Volta ao Algarve, Bernhard Eisel
 Stage 3 Critérium International, Edvald Boasson Hagen
 Stages 2 & 3 Driedaagse De Panne, Mark Cavendish
 Volta Limburg Classic, Tony Martin
 Stages 2 & 4 Itzulia Basque Country, Kim Kirchen
 Scheldeprijs, Mark Cavendish
 GP de Denain, Edvald Boasson Hagen
 La Flèche Wallonne, Kim Kirchen
 Overall Tour de Georgia, Kanstantsin Sivtsov
Stages 3 & 7, Greg Henderson
Stage 6, Kanstantsin Sivtsov
 Prologue Tour de Romandie, Mark Cavendish
 Stage 2 Giro della Regione Friuli, Andrea Piechele
 Giro d'Italia
Stages 4 & 13, Mark Cavendish
Stage 17, André Greipel
Stage 21, Marco Pinotti
 Stage 3 Ronde de l'Isard, Gert Dockx
 Stages 1 & 3 Bayern Rundfahrt, Gerald Ciolek
 Stage 2 Critérium du Dauphiné, George Hincapie
 Ster ZLM Toer
Prologue, Tony Martin
Stage 4, Mark Cavendish
 Stage 6 Tour de Suisse, Kim Kirchen
  National Time trial, Marco Pinotti
  National Time trial, František Raboň
  National Time trial, Kim Kirchen
  National Time trial, Bert Grabsch
  National Time trial, Edvald Boasson Hagen
 GP Citta di Guastalla, Andrea Piechele
 Tour de France
Stage 4, Kim Kirchen
Stages 5, 8, 2 & 13, Mark Cavendish
Stage 18, Marcus Burghardt
 Österreich-Rundfahrt
Stage 4, André Greipel
Stage 6, Bert Grabsch
 Overall Sachsen Tour, Bert Grabsch
Stages 1 & 3, André Greipel
Stage 4, Bert Grabsch
 Gp Ciclistico di Arcade, Andrea Piechele
 Overall Tour de l'Ain, Linus Gerdemann
Stage 3, Tony Martin
Stage 4, Linus Gerdemann
 Coppa Ugo Agostoni, Linus Gerdemann
 BinckBank Tour
Stage 2, André Greipel
Stage 6, Edvald Boasson Hagen
 Overall Tour of Ireland, Marco Pinotti
Stages 1, 2 & 3, Mark Cavendish
Stage 5, František Raboň
 Overall Deutschland Tour, Linus Gerdemann
Stage 1, Linus Gerdemann
Stage 4, André Greipel
Stage 5, Gerald Ciolek
Stage 8, Tony Martin
 Astico Brenta, Andrea Piechele
 Tour of Missouri
Stages 1, 2 & 6, Mark Cavendish
Stage 4, Michael Barry
 Stages 4, 5 & 7 Tour of Britain, Edvald Boasson Hagen
 Nürnberger Altstadt, André Greipel
 Kamp. van Vlaanderen, André Greipel
 Münsterland Giro, André Greipel
 Gran Premio Calvatone, Andrea Piechele
 Paris–Bourges, Bernhard Eisel

2009 – Team Columbia–High Road/Team Columbia–HTC

  National Time trial, Michael Rogers
 Stage 1 Tour Down Under, André Greipel
 Stages 4 & 6 Tour of Qatar, Mark Cavendish
 Stages 4 & 5 Tour of California, Mark Cavendish
 Clásica de Almería, Greg Henderson
 Vuelta a Murcia
Stage 2, Greg Henderson
Stage 3, František Raboň
 Strade Bianche, Thomas Löfkvist
 Stage 7 Tirreno–Adriatico, Mark Cavendish
 Milano-Sanremo, Mark Cavendish
 Stage 3 Critérium International, Tony Martin
 Stages 2 & 3 Driedaagse De Panne, Mark Cavendish
 Gent–Wevelgem, Edvald Boasson Hagen
 Itzulia Basque Country
Stage 4, Michael Albasini
Stage 5, Marco Pinotti
 Tour de Romandie
Prologue, František Raboň
Stage 3 TTT
 Giro d'Italia
Stage 1 TTT
Stage 7, Edvald Boasson Hagen
Stage 8, Kanstantsin Sivtsov
Stages 9, 11 & 13, Mark Cavendish
 Stage 6 4 Jours de Dunkerque, André Greipel
 Stage 6 Volta Catalunya, Greg Henderson
 Bayern Rundfahrt
Stages 1, 3 & 5, André Greipel
Stage 4, Tony Martin
 Neuseen Classics, André Greipel
 Philly Cycling Classic, André Greipel
 Stage 4 Critérium du Dauphiné, Bert Grabsch
 Tour de Suisse
Stage 2, Bernhard Eisel
Stages 3 & 6, Mark Cavendish
Stage 5, Michael Albasini
Stage 7, Kim Kirchen
Stage 8, Tony Martin
 Stages 1, 2 & 4 Ster ZLM Toer, André Greipel
  National Time trial, Marco Pinotti
  National Time trial, František Raboň
  National Time trial, Kim Kirchen
  National Time trial, Edvald Boasson Hagen
  National Time trial, Bert Grabsch
 Tour de France
Stages 2, 3, 10, 11, 19 & 21, Mark Cavendish
 Overall Österreich-Rundfahrt, Michael Albasini
Stages 1, 6 & 8, André Greipel
Stage 2, Michael Albasini
 Sachsen Tour
Stage 1, André Greipel
Stage 5, Thomas Löfkvist
 Sparkassen Giro, Mark Cavendish
 Tour de Pologne
Stages 4 & 6, Edvald Boasson Hagen
Stage 7, André Greipel
  National Time trial, Maxime Monfort
 Stage 2 Tour of Ireland, Mark Cavendish
 Overall BinckBank Tour, Edvald Boasson Hagen
Stages 6 & 7, Edvald Boasson Hagen
  National Road race, George Hincapie
 Vuelta a España
Stage 3 Greg Henderson
Stages 4, 5, 16 & 21, André Greipel
 Stages 1 & 2 Tour of Missouri, Mark Cavendish
 Overall Tour of Britain, Edvald Boasson Hagen
Stages 3, 4, 5 & 6, Edvald Boasson Hagen
 Paris–Bourges, André Greipel

2010 – Team HTC–Columbia

 Overall Tour Down Under, André Greipel
Stages 1, 2 & 4, André Greipel
 Trofeo Calvià, André Greipel
 Stage 4 Tour of Oman, Leigh Howard
 Stage 2 Vuelta ao Algarve, André Greipel
 Vuelta a Andalucía, Michael Rogers
 Overall Vuelta a Murcia, František Raboň
Stage 4, František Raboň
 Stage 1 Volta Catalunya, Mark Cavendish
 Gent–Wevelgem, Bernhard Eisel
 Stages 1, 2, 5, 6 & 8 Tour of Turkey, André Greipel
 Tour de Romandie
Prologue, Marco Pinotti
Stage 2, Mark Cavendish
 Overall Tour of California, Michael Rogers
Stage 1, Mark Cavendish
Stage 7, Tony Martin
 Giro d'Italia
Stage 9, Matthew Goss
Stage 18, André Greipel
 Overall Bayern Rundfahrt, Maxime Monfort
Stage 4, Maxime Monfort
 Philly Cycling Classic, Matthew Goss
 Overall Ster ZLM Toer, Adam Hansen
Stage 3, Adam Hansen
 Stage 9 Tour de Suisse, Tony Martin
  National Time trial, František Raboň
  National Time trial, Martin Velits
  National Time trial, Tony Martin
  National Time trial, Marco Pinotti
  National Road race, Aleksejs Saramotins
 Stages 1 & 6 Österreich-Rundfahrt, André Greipel
 Tour de France
Stages 5, 6, 11, 18 & 20, Mark Cavendish
 Stages 2 & 7 Tour de Pologne, André Greipel
 Danmark Rundt
Stage 1, Matthew Goss
Stage 4, Mark Renshaw
Stage 6, Hayden Roulston
 Overall BinckBank Tour, Tony Martin
Stages 2 & 6, André Greipel
Stage 7, Tony Martin
 Bretagne Classic, Matthew Goss
 Omloop Mandel, Jan Ghyselinck
 Vuelta a España
Stage 1 TTT
Stages 12, 13 & 18, Mark Cavendish
Stage 17, Peter Velits
 Overall Tour of Britain, Michael Albasini
Stages 1, 6 & 8, André Greipel
Stage 3, Michael Albasini
 Kamp. van Vlaanderen, Leigh Howard
 GP d'Isbergues, Aleksejs Saramotins
 Overall Tour of Southland, Hayden Roulston 
Stages 1, 7 & 8, Hayden Roulston

2011 – HTC–Highroad

 Overall Bay Cycling Classic, Matthew Goss
Stages 1 & 4, Matthew Goss
  National Road race, Hayden Roulston 
 Schwalbe Classic, Matthew Goss
 Stage 1 Tour Down Under, Matthew Goss
 Overall Tour of Qatar, Mark Renshaw
Stage 4, Mark Renshaw
 Stage 2 Tour of Oman, Matthew Goss
 Stage 6 Tour of Oman, Mark Cavendish
 Overall Volta ao Algarve, Tony Martin
Stage 2, John Degenkolb
Stage 5, Tony Martin
 Stage 1 Dwars door West-Vlaanderen, John Degenkolb
 Overall Paris–Nice, Tony Martin
Stage 3, Matthew Goss
Stage 6, Tony Martin
 2011 Milan–San Remo, Matthew Goss
 Stage 1 Volta Catalunya, Aleksejs Saramotins
 Scheldeprijs, Mark Cavendish
 Stage 6 Itzulia Basque Country, Tony Martin
 Rutland – Melton Classic, Zakkari Dempster
 Girvan 3-day, Zakkari Dempster
 Eschborn–Frankfurt, John Degenkolb
 Giro d'Italia
Stage 1 TTT
Stages 10 & 12, Mark Cavendish
 Stage 8 Tour of California, Matthew Goss
 Bayern Rundfahrt
Stage 2, John Degenkolb
Stage 3, Michael Albasini
 GP Kanton Aargau, Michael Albasini
 Philly Cycling Classic, Alex Rasmussen
 Critérium du Dauphiné
Stages 2 & 4, John Degenkolb
Stage 3, Tony Martin
 Ster ZLM Toer
Prologue, Patrick Gretsch
Stage 4, Leigh Howard
  National Time trial, Aleksejs Saramotins
  National Time trial, Kanstantsin Sivtsov
  National Time trial, Bert Grabsch
  National Time trial, Matthew Brammeier
  National Road race, Matthew Brammeier
 Tour de France
Stages 5, 7, 11, 15 & 21, Mark Cavendish
Stage 20, Tony Martin
 Stage 7 Österreich-Rundfahrt, Bert Grabsch
 Stage 3 Tour of Utah, Tejay van Garderen
 Ride London Classic, Mark Cavendish
 Prologue USA Challenge, Patrick Gretsch
 Vuelta a España
Stage 10, Tony Martin
Stage 13, Michael Albasini
 Tour of Britain
Stages 1 & 9, Mark Cavendish
Stage 5, Mark Renshaw
 Overall Tour of Beijing, Tony Martin
Stage 1, Tony Martin
 Chrono des Nations, Tony Martin
 Prologue and Stage 2 Tour of Southland, Hayden Roulston

Supplementary statistics

See also
HTC–Highroad
List of HTC–Highroad riders
2011 HTC–Highroad season
2010 Team HTC–Columbia season

References

Wins
Deutsche